Fresh Start is a 2018 relaunch of comic book publications by Marvel Comics, following Marvel Legacy.

Changes to the Marvel Universe
The relaunch saw the return of Tony Stark, Steve Rogers, Logan, Odinson and Bruce Banner to their classic identities of Iron Man, Captain America, Wolverine, Thor and Hulk respectively after all these characters had been replaced by legacy heroes in recent times. For example, Tony Stark ended up in a coma in Civil War II, and his armor was donned by both reborn-villain Doctor Doom in Infamous Iron Man and fifteen-year-old genius Riri Williams (who took on the codename Ironheart) in Invincible Iron Man; Sam Wilson, a longtime ally of Captain America as Falcon, had taken the mantle in All-New Captain America; Laura Kinney, the female clone of Logan who is also viewed as Logan's daughter, became the Wolverine in All-New Wolverine; Jane Foster, a longtime love interest of Thor, became 'Mighty Thor' in Thor vol. 4; Bruce Banner died in Civil War II, with Amadeus Cho becoming the 'Totally Awesome Hulk'.

The relaunch also saw the return of Marvel's first family, the Fantastic Four, which had broken up following the conclusion of the 2015 Secret Wars storyline. The relaunch marked Peter Parker and Mary Jane Watson resuming their relationship for the first time since their marriage was retconned out of existence in the "One More Day" storyline. The Fresh Start initiative also includes a new incarnation of the West Coast Avengers, consisting of Hawkeye, Kate Bishop, Gwenpool, America Chavez, Quentin Quire, and Kate's boyfriend Johnny. The teaser poster featured Jessica Jones and Miles Morales, characters created by Brian Michael Bendis. Bendis had recently moved to DC Comics; the poster was seen as confirmation that Marvel would keep publishing those characters.

On April 18, 2018, a sampler collection – Marvel Universe Magazine – was published, similar to Marvel Legacy #1 from the previous year. It included previews from several forthcoming new #1 issues. Many writers have been assigned with new titles; The Amazing Spider-Mans Dan Slott, Deadpool's Gerry Duggan and The Avengers' Mark Waid and others left their title due to the Fresh Start relaunch. The X-Men line was relaunched with six new titles as part of the Dawn of X relaunch in 2019. The time-displaced original X-Men who were brought into the present day during Bendis' run on the 2012 All-New X-Men series before starring in their own X-Men Blue title, were returned to the past during the Extermination miniseries.

Criticism
David Barnett, from The Guardian in February 2018, pointed out that most of the characters involved have appeared in recent films or TV series, or are about to do so, and criticized that effort to emulate the feel of those productions instead of taking full advantage of the capabilities of the comic book medium to produce fantasy and sci-fi without the constraints of special effects budgets. He also considered that Marvel may be stepping back from its attempts to make comics featuring diverse female, black, Asian and LGBT characters, trying instead to appeal to its most conservative readership. Graeme McMillan, from The Hollywood Reporter in February 2018, pointed out that Marvel has been announcing wide relaunches annually since 2012, but have provided limited changes.

Dave Buesing, for Popverse in July 2022, commented on the longevity of the Fresh Start era – at four years old it is "the longest-running Marvel era of this time period". Buesing highlighted Google search analytics, with the caveat that "these metrics are not reflections of quality or sales", where "the peak of Marvel's 'Fresh Start' is 3.5x less searched than the previous year's 'Marvel Legacy' peaks" and that "searchers in 2022 are [...] 2-3x more likely to be looking for 'Marvel NOW!' than Marvel 'Fresh Start'". Buesing wrote that "when you look at the long reach of Google to represent one aspect of human curiosity, comic fans are simply not connecting with these initiatives anywhere near the degree they did at the start of the '10s". Buesing anticipates that the Fresh Start era will come to an end soon.

Titles

Ongoing series

Events

Limited series

Digital originals
Digital comics, first released as miniseries on Marvel Unlimited, and then collected as printed trade paperbacks.

Infinity Comics 
Infinity Comics are weekly stories told in visionary vertical format exclusively released on Marvel Unlimited.

Gamerverse

One-shot series

One-shots

See also
List of current Marvel Comics publications

Notes
 The release dates of these series is currently unknown due to the COVID-19 pandemic.

References

Marvel Comics storylines
2018 comics debuts
Comic book reboots